Most of the sketches in the TV series Portlandia feature Fred Armisen and Carrie Brownstein playing one of a variety of pairs of characters, unless noted below. Some frequently appearing characters are:

 Fred and Carrie: played with minimal costumes, makeup, and hairstyling, these are the show's version of Armisen and Brownstein themselves, living in a house together in Portland. Their onscreen relationship was inspired by Bert and Ernie's  relationship on Sesame Street.
 Milton: Fred and Carrie's landlord, played by Steve Buscemi (who also directed several episodes). Milton has an overly casual approach to Fred and Carrie's privacy and a lax attitude regarding necessary repairs.
 Peter and Nance: an earnest and open-hearted middle-aged couple. Peter speaks with a stammer and is open to trying new things, albeit hesitantly; Nance gives him her full support but is often the voice of reason in the couple. They have a tendency to go farther into their new enthusiasms than they expected at first. (for example, a desire to know the source of their free-range chicken ends in their joining a cult).
 Dave and Kath: a very active, overly-intense couple who commit 100% to any new thing they do, causing annoyance to their friends and a generally joyless result. Their interests include things having to do with the outdoors, such as hiking and fleece sweaters.
 Nina and Lance: a couple exhibiting stereotypical gender roles. Lance, played by Brownstein with an electronically deepened voice, is mustached and emotionless and loves fixing cars and riding motorcycles; Nina, played by Armisen, is his high-maintenance girlfriend who loves social media, birthdays, parties, and romance.
 Candace Devereaux and Toni Rose: the proprietors of Women and Women First, a feminist bookstore. Caricatures of Second-wave feminists, they run their bookstore without amenities such as alphabetized stock or a computer to search for books, and are often hostile to customers on the grounds that they lack proper feminist attitudes or use words or gestures that trigger them in various ways. Candace (played by Armisen) harbors barely repressed rage which often boils over into threats of grievous bodily harm to customers who annoy her. In the fifth season it is revealed that before running Women and Women First, both Candace and Toni were high-powered executives in the New York publishing world. 
 Spyke and Iris: a hipster couple constantly looking for whatever is more authentic, more undiscovered, and more alternative, and always ready to drop something when it is "over". Spyke is known for his opposition to driving and cars in general, given his firm stance on "Bikers' Rights." (This stance eventually shifts in season 4 when Spyke must buy a car for his job.)
 Bryce Shivers and Lisa Eversman: entrepreneurs who start many businesses based on quirky concepts. These characters were the source of the catchphrase "put a bird on it!" from a sketch featuring a business that sold a variety of products with silhouettes of birds attached to turn them into "art". (In the opening sketch of the first episode of the series, Brownstein's character comments that Portland is a city where one can still "put a bird on something and call it art".) The characters are featured again in a skit called "We Can Pickle That", which involves putting various objects in brine.
 Jeffrey and Quinn: young transients living on the streets of Portland who spend their days panhandling and busking with improvised musical instruments (such as drums made of plastic buckets). In one episode, we learn that Quinn is actually a "trustafarian," from a wealthy background.
 The Mayor of Portland (played by Kyle MacLachlan): an enthusiastic but naive booster for the city who constantly thinks up not-quite-plausible improvement schemes which he asks Fred and Carrie to implement. It is revealed that some of the improvements he has made to the city of Portland are actually funded by his parents. Sketches involving the mayor often feature the actual mayor of Portland from 2009 to 2012, Sam Adams, who plays his assistant. 
 Royce and Alicia: Public information associates for the Portland Milk Advisory Board who are constantly coming up with new and exotic ways to get people excited about milk and how to promote their kooky new forms of it. Such wacky ideas include cookie milk, berry seed milk, and raw cow milk (an unpasteurized version of milk that has the uncanny presence of blood in it). Alicia often states, "He's my boss!" even though she obviously has better qualifications than Royce, having attended UC Davis. The characters only appeared in interstitial segments in the show during commercial breaks.
 Eco-terrorists: A group of young, eccentric individuals who attempt to protest major companies and corporations (such as SeaWorld) in the name of ecological rights. Unfortunately their acts rarely actually pan out due to poor planning and group disorganization.
 Kris and Malcolm: an older, mellow couple and parents to multiple children (including one of the eco-terrorists, played by Olivia Wilde). They are overprotective of their children, and portray stereotypes of a relaxed, retired life.
 Brendan and Michelle: two over-bearing parents who think they know everything.
 Vince and Jacqueline: a stereotypical goth couple who wear black clothes and white face makeup all the time, drive a hearse, and live in a house filled with funereal decorations.
 Claire and Doug: Claire is a successful career woman, while Doug stays at home and can barely take care of himself. In a Season 6 episode, Claire breaks up with Doug and starts a romantic relationship with Candace (see above).
 The Swingers - played by Ebbe Roe Smith and Kristine Levine (whose character is also named Kristine). A couple living in "the lifestyle" who appear conventional on the surface. They have a four-way sexual encounter with Peter and Nance (see above) after the latter drive by their house on new motorcycles and ask for directions.

References

Portlandia
Portlandia (TV series)